Protochonetes is an extinct genus of brachiopods. Its shell was lined with spines.

References 

Prehistoric brachiopod genera
Silurian animals of Australia
Silurian animals of Europe
Silurian animals of North America
Silurian animals of South America
Devonian animals of North America
Devonian animals of Australia
Devonian animals of Europe
Devonian animals of Asia
Prehistoric invertebrates of Oceania
Productida
Paleozoic life of New Brunswick
Paleozoic life of the Northwest Territories
Paleozoic life of Nova Scotia
Paleozoic life of Quebec